The Oaktree Arena was a speedway racing track located near Highbridge, Somerset, England,  and is built alongside the M5 motorway.
There is also a restaurant which can be hired for weddings and events. It is also used for property auctions, and car boot sales. The site also hosts a golf driving range.

Speedway
Speedway was introduced in 2000. The team were founded by promoter Andy Hewlett and named the Somerset Rebels, entering the Conference League. Hewlett had been searching for a venue in Somerset to host speedway for some time, when he was offered the site by a local farmer who had hosted banger meetings (cars) there a couple of times.

References

External links
 Oak Tree Arena official website

Defunct speedway venues in England
Sports venues in Somerset